Eugenium was a village or fort of the Illyrian Parthini whose location is still unknown.

See also
Parthini
List of settlements in Illyria

References

Cities in ancient Illyria
Former populated places in the Balkans
Illyrian Albania